Alex Frederick Sulfsted (born December 21, 1977) is a former American football offensive lineman in the National Football League for the Washington Redskins and Cincinnati Bengals.  He played college football at Miami University and was drafted in the sixth round of the 2001 NFL Draft by the Kansas City Chiefs.  Alex retired from the NFL to pursue a career in real estate.

Alex married Meggan Yeager in May 2006.

References

1977 births
Living people
American football offensive guards
American football offensive tackles
Cincinnati Bengals players
Miami RedHawks football players
People from Lebanon, Ohio
Washington Redskins players